The Damned (released as These Are the Damned in the United States) is a 1963 British science fiction horror film directed by Joseph Losey and starring Macdonald Carey, Shirley Anne Field, Viveca Lindfors and Oliver Reed. Based on H.L. Lawrence's 1960 novel The Children of Light, it was a Hammer Film production.

Plot
Simon Wells, a middle-aged American tourist, is on a boating holiday off the south coast of England. He has recently divorced and left his career as an insurance executive. In Weymouth, he meets 20-year-old Joan, who lures him into a brutal mugging at the hands of her brother King and his motorbike gang.

The next day Joan joins Simon on his boat, and defies her overprotective brother who attempts to keep her from leaving.

Simon is willing to forgive and forget; Joan implies that the beating was inevitable after Simon attempted to pick up Joan in a bar. She describes the abuse she suffers from King whenever men show interest in her. Simon urges her to run away with him but she insists upon returning to shore. Their time on the water is observed by a member of King's gang.

Meanwhile within the caves of the nearby coast live nine children, all aged 11, whose skin is cold to the touch. They appear healthy, well-dressed and intelligent but know little about the outside world. Their home is under continuous video surveillance and they are educated via closed circuit television by Bernard, who deflects questions about their purpose and their isolation with promises that they will learn the answers someday. The children are regularly visited by men in radiation protection suits.

That night, Joan and Simon meet at a cliff-top house where they have sex. The house is surrounded by King's gang but the couple escape and reach the relative safety of a nearby military base. The couple descend the cliff to the beach, pursued by King. They find a network of caves leading to an underground bunker attached to the military base, where they meet the children.

Although Bernard is forced to keep the children under watch, he allows them one chamber in the caves without cameras.  The children are unaware that their "secret hideout" is known to their captors and they keep there mementos of people that they believe are their parents.  The children host Joan, Simon and King in this "secret" room and smuggle food to them.  Joan and Simon plan to rescue the children and they pressure King into helping them; the visitors soon feel unwell.

Bernard urges the children to give up their new friends, and reveals his knowledge of their secret place. The children refuse and destroy the surveillance cameras. Bernard sends men in radiation suits but King and Simon overpower them. Simon uses one of their Geiger counters and discovers that the children are radioactive. The intruders lead the children out of the caves but they are ambushed by more men in radiation suits and most of the children are taken back to the bunker.

King grabs one of the boys and escapes in a stolen car. He is overcome by radiation sickness and orders the boy out of the car.  The boy is immediately recaptured. King is pursued by a helicopter, loses control of the car and is killed. Joan and Simon escape by boat, but they are also overcome by sickness. A helicopter hovers above as their boat drifts off course; the pilot has orders to destroy it once the occupants are confirmed dead.

Bernard confides in his mistress Freya that he regrets the children now know they are prisoners.  They were born radioactive, the result of a nuclear accident. This enables them to be resistant to nuclear fallout and so they will survive the "inevitable" nuclear war to come, according to Bernard.  When Freya rejects him and his plan, he kills her. The final scene depicts holiday-goers enjoying the beach, unable to hear the desperate cries of the imprisoned children nearby.

Cast
 Macdonald Carey as Simon Wells
 Shirley Anne Field as Joan
 Viveca Lindfors as Freya Neilson
 Alexander Knox as Bernard
 Oliver Reed as King
 Walter Gotell as Major Holland
 James Villiers as Captain Gregory
 Tom Kempinski  as Ted
 Kenneth Cope  as Sid 
 Brian Oulton  as Mr. Dingle 
 Barbara Everest  as Miss Lamont 
Alan McClelland as Mr. Stuart 
 James Maxwell  as Mr. Talbot

The children
 Rachel Clay as Victoria
 Caroline Sheldon as Elizabeth
Rebecca Dignam as Anne
 Siobhan Taylor as Mary
Nicholas Clay as Richard
Kit Williams as Henry
Christopher Witty as William
 David Palmer as George
 John Thompson as Charles

Production
American director Joseph Losey had moved to Britain after being blacklisted by Hollywood. The film was produced by Hammer, which had enjoyed great success with such horror films as Dracula, and The Curse of Frankenstein. A script was originally written by Ben Barzman which was reasonably faithful to the original novel. Losey then had this rewritten by Evan Jones two weeks prior to filming. Oliver Reed recalled that Losey, “used to take the cast out to dinner and preach anti-Bomb stuff to them.” Losey originally wanted Neilson the sculptor to be killed by one of the helicopters but the studio insisted that Bernard kill her. The studio also wished to tone down the incestuous references between King and Joan.

The sculptures were all by British artist Elisabeth Frink. Frink not only lent these but also was on location for their shooting and coached Lindfors on performing the sculptor’s method of building up plaster, which was then ferociously worked and carved. The film was shot at Hammer's Bray Studios and on location around Weymouth, the Isle of Portland and nearby Chesil Beach.

The film went over budget by £25,000.

Release
The film was shot in May–June 1961, and was reviewed by the British censors on 20 December 1961, who gave it an X certificate without any cuts. However, it wasn't released in the UK until 20 May 1963, when it was shown at the London Pavilion as the second half of a double bill of X-rated horror films. In spite of the very discreet release, it was noticed by a film critic from The Times, who gave it a very positive review, stating that "Joseph Losey is one of the most intelligent, ambitious and constantly exciting film-makers now working in this country, if not indeed in the world—The Damned is very much a film to be seen, for at its best it hits with a certainty of aim which is as exciting as it is devastating, and hits perhaps in a place where it is important we should be hurt."

When it was released in the United States in 1965, as These Are the Damned, it had been cut to 77 minutes. It was originally shown as part of a double bill with Genghis Khan. A complete print was released in US art house cinemas in 2007. Critic David McKee noted, "A few American reviewers realized These Are the Damned’s prescient nature but it remained mainly the province of Losey scholars and university film societies before being rediscovered through home video."

On 15 January 2010, it was released on DVD as part of the Icons of Suspense Collection from Hammer Films. The Damned was called "the highpoint of the first wave of the British postwar Science Fiction films".

See also
 Akira (1988 film)
 Village of the Damned (1960 film)

References

External links 
 
 "Nefarious Doings in a World of Sunlit Decay" by Dave Kehr, a review in The New York Times, 02-04-2010.
 The Damned at BFI Screenonline

1963 films
1960s science fiction horror films
British black-and-white films
British science fiction horror films
Cold War films
Columbia Pictures films
1960s English-language films
Films about nuclear war and weapons
Films based on British novels
Films based on science fiction novels
Films directed by Joseph Losey
Films scored by James Bernard
Films shot at Bray Studios
Hammer Film Productions films
Hammer Film Productions horror films
Films about World War III
Films shot in Dorset
Films set in Dorset
1960s British films
Films set in bunkers